John Horlick may refer to:

John Van Horlick, ice hockey player
John Horlick of the Horlick baronets